Kitchener-Waterloo may refer to:
 The cities of Kitchener, Ontario and Waterloo, Ontario, Canada
 The Tri-Cities (Ontario) which include Kitchener, Cambridge and Waterloo.
 The Regional Municipality of Waterloo, which consists of the tri-cities and surrounding rural townships.

Electoral districts 
 Kitchener—Waterloo (electoral district)
 Kitchener—Waterloo (provincial electoral district)